Victor Hopkins may refer to:

 Vic Hopkins (1911–1984), English cricketer
 Victor Hopkins (cyclist) (1904–1969), American Olympic cyclist